Aloysius J. Rekowski (1921-2006) was a Canadian Roman Catholic priest, scriptural scholar, historian and translator. He was born to Kashubian-Canadian parents on October 23, 1921, in Wilno, Ontario, and died in Toronto, Ontario, on June 17, 2006.

Father Rekowski made his first profession to the Redemptorist missionary order and was ordained a priest in 1948. His vocation led him to many different places, from serving missions out of Athabasca, Alberta, to advanced study at the Lumen Vitae Catethetical Institute in Brussels. His particular field of academic expertise was Scriptural study.

In addition to his pastoral work, Father Rekowski made two notable contributions to Kashubian studies. The first was An 1880 Journey through Kashub, Poland, an English translation of Hieronim Derdowski's epic O Panu Czorlińścim co do Pucka po sece jachoł (Mr. Czorlinsczi Goes To Puck To Buy Fishing Nets), which is regarded as the beginning of Kashubian poetry. In 1997, he published The Saga of the Kashub People in Poland, Canada, U.S.A. In the summer of 2002 a Special Event was held by the Wilno Heritage Society to commemorate Father Rekowski's contribution to Kashubian studies.

References

Canadian people of Kashubian descent
Kashubian clergy
Kashubian culture
Kashubian-American history
1921 births
2006 deaths